The Medal of the City of Paris is a distinction created in 1911 and awarded by the mayor of Paris on the proposal of elected members of the Paris Council or associations. There are several levels: bronze, silver, large silver and vermeil.

It rewards people who have achieved a "remarkable act concerning the capital" but is also awarded systematically to centenary Parisians and couples celebrating their golden wedding (50 years), diamond (60 years), platinum (70 years), alabaster (75) or oak (80).

List of recipients
 Michael Jackson (Grand Vermeil Medal 1988)
 Maurice Allais (Grand Vermeil Medal 1989)
 Josy Eisenberg (Grand Vermeil Medal 1993)
 Brigitte Bardot (Grand Vermeil Medal 1994)
 Hayao Miyazaki (Grand Vermeil Medal 2001)
 Kihachirō Kawamoto (Grand Vermeil Medal 2003)
 Toni Morrison (Grand Vermeil Medal 2004)
 Jackie Chan (Grand Vermeil Medal 2005)
 Diana Ross (Grand Vermeil Medal 2005)
 Jerry Lewis (Grand Vermeil Medal 2006)
 Robert Lamoureux (Grand Vermeil Medal 2009)
 Cecilia Bartoli (Grand Vermeil Medal 2010)
 Jane Fonda (Grand Vermeil Medal 2010)
 Inès de La Fressange (Grand Vermeil Medal 2010)
 Michel Galabru (Grand Vermeil Medal 2011)
 Paolo Conte (Grand Vermeil Medal 2011)
 Michael Lonsdale (Grand Vermeil Medal 2011)
 Pierre Santini (Grand Vermeil Medal 2012)
 Juliette Gréco (Grand Vermeil Medal 2012)
 Ettore Scola (Grand Vermeil Medal 2012)
 Henry Chapier (Grand Vermeil Medal 2013)
 Vera Baboun (Grand Vermeil Medal 2015)
 Herbie Hancock (Grand Vermeil Medal 2015)
 Rafael Nadal (Grand Vermeil Medal 2015)
 Michel Legrand (Grand Vermeil Medal 2016)
 Cyril Lignac (Grand Vermeil Medal 2016)
 Patti Smith (Grand Vermeil Medal 2017)
 Karl Lagerfeld (Grand Vermeil Medal 2017)
 Pierre Rabhi (Grand Vermeil Medal 2017)
 Mamoudou Gassama (Grand Vermeil Medal 2018)
 Garo Paylan (Grand Vermeil Medal 2018)
 Hocine Ziani (Grand Vermeil Medal 2019)
 Pia Klemp (Grand Vermeil Medal 2019) Refused to accept the award 
 Carola Rackete (Grand Vermeil Medal 2019) Refused to accept the award

References 

Orders, decorations, and medals of France